The men's slalom K-1 (kayak single) competition at the 2018 Asian Games was held from 21 to 23 August 2018. Each NOC could enter two athletes but only one of them could advance to the final.

Schedule
All times are Western Indonesia Time (UTC+07:00)

Results
Legend
DNS — Did not start

Heats

Semifinal

Final

References

External links
Official website

Men's slalom K-1